Emergence: The Connected Lives of Ants, Brains, Cities, and Software is a book written by media theorist Steven Berlin Johnson, published in 2001. Early review drafts had the subtitle "What the New Science Can Teach Us About Our Minds, Our Communities, and Ourselves" instead of the "Connected life..."

Report

Quote
"The whole is sometimes smarter than the sum of its parts."

Achievements
The New York Times - Notable book
Voice Literary Supplement – Top25 books of the year
Esquire Magazine – Best book of the year

References

2001 non-fiction books